This is a discography for guitarist Marc Ribot, including both his own albums and significant recordings to which he has contributed. The year in brackets indicates the date of first release.

Albums

As sideman
With Noël Akchoté
 Lust Corner (Winter & Winter, 1997)

With Ambitious Lovers
 Lust (Elektra, 1991)

With the Anarchist Republic of Bzzz
 Anarchist Republic of Bzzz (Sub Rosa, 2009)

With Trey Anastasio
 Surrender to the Air (Elektra, 1996)

With Laurie Anderson
 Bright Red (Warner Bros., 1994)

With Dick Annegarn
 Adieu Verdure (Tot Ou Tard/Warner Music, 1999)

With Aterciopelados
 Caribe Atómico (RCA International, 1998)

With Auktyon
 Girls Sing (2007)

With Susana Baca
 Eco de Sombras (Luaka Bop, 2000)
 Espíritu Vivo (Luaka Bop, 2002)
 Travesias (Luaka Bop, 2006)

With Eszter Balint
 Flicker (Scratchie/East West, 1999)

With Cyro Baptista
 Vira Loucos (Avant, 1997)
 Beat the Donkey (Tzadik, 2002)

With Barkmarket
 Easy Listening (Purge Sound League, 1989)
 Vegas Throat - (Def American, 1992)

With Alain Bashung
 Chatterton (Barclay, 1994)
 L'Imprudence (Barclay, 2002)
 Bleu pétrole (Barclay, 2008)

With Badawi
 Safe (Asphodel, 2006)

With The Black Keys
 Attack & Release (Nonesuch/V2, 2008)

With Claus Boesser-Ferrari
 How We Became Americans (Acoustic Music, 2009)

With Richard Buckner
 Devotion + Doubt (MCA, 1997)

With Solomon Burke
 Soul Alive (Rounder, 1984)

With Robert Burger
 City of Strangers (Tzadik, 2008)

With T Bone Burnett
 The Criminal Under My Own Hat (Columbia, 1992)
 The True False Identity (Columbia, 2006)
 Tooth of Crime (Nonesuch, 2008)

With Andrés Calamaro
 Alta Suciedad (Gasa/Warner Bros., 1997)
 Honestidad Brutal (WEA, 1999)

With Teddy Thompson
 Upfront & Down Low (Verve, 2007)

With Vinicius Cantuária
 Vinicius (Transparent Music, 2001)
 Cymbals (Naive, 2007)

With Vinicio Capossela
 Il Ballo di San Vito (CDG/East West, 1996) 
 Canzoni a manovella (2000)
 Ovunque proteggi (2006)
 La nave sta arrivando (2011)
 Marinai, profeti e balene (2011)
 Rebetiko gymnastas (2012)

With Marco Cappelli
 IDR (Italian Doc Remix) (Itinera, 2008)

With Lori Carson
 Shelter (DGC, 1990)

With James Carter
 Layin' the Cut (Atlantic, 2000)

With Charming Hostess
 The Bowls Project (Tzadik, 2009)

With Chocolate Genius
 Black Music (V2, 1998)
 GodMusic (V2, 2001)
 Black Yankee Rock (Commotion, 2005)

With Shemekia Copeland
 Never Going Back (Telarc, 2008)

With Cibo Matto
 Viva! La Woman (Warner Bros., 1996)
 Super Relax (Warner Bros., 1997)
 Stereo * Type A (Warner Bros., 1999)

With Club d'Elf
 Live at Tonic (Kufala, 2005)

With Beth Orton
 Sugaring Season (ANTI-, 2012)

With Anthony Coleman
 With Every Breath: The Music of Shabbat at BJ (Knitting Factory, 1999)

With Tom Cora
 Hallelujah, Anyway – Remembering Tom Cora (Tzadik, 1999)

With Gal Costa
 O Sorriso do Gato de Alice (BMG/RCA, 1993)

With Elvis Costello
 Spike (Warner Bros., 1989)
 Mighty Like a Rose (Warner Bros., 1991)
 Kojak Variety (Warner Bros., 1995)

With Corin Curschellas
 Valdun Voices of Rumantsch (Migros Genossenschaftsbund, 1997)

With Dead Combo
 Lisboa Mulata (Dead & Company, 2011)

With Devine & Stratton
 Cardiffians (Les Disques du Crepuscule (Belgium), 1990)

With DJ Logic
 Project Logic (Ropeadope, 1999)

With Dave Douglas
 Freak In (Bluebird/RCA Victor, 2003)

With the Lucien Dubuis Trio
 Ultime Cosmos (Enja, 2009)

With Marty Ehrlich's Dark Woods Ensemble
 Sojourn (Tzadik, 1999)

With Elysian Fields
 Elysian Fields (Radioactive, 1996)

With Carol Emanuel
 Tops of Trees (Evva, 1995)

With Mikel Erentxun
 El Abrazo del Erizo (WEA Latina, 1996) 

With Ellery Eskelin
 The Sun Died (Soul Note, 1995)
 Ten (Hat Hut, 2004)

With Evan and Jaron
 Evan and Jaron (Columbia, 2000)

With Marianne Faithfull
 Blazing Away (Island, 1990)
 Easy Come, Easy Go (Naive, 2008)

With The Flaming Hoops
 Flaming Hoops (Newsic (Japan), 1989)

With Foetus
 Gash (Sony/Columbia, 1995)
 Null/Void (Cleopatra, 1997)

With Gavin Friday & The Man Seezer
 Each Man Kills the Thing He Loves (Island, 1989)

With Sue Garner
 Shadyside (Thrill Jockey, 2002)

With Allen Ginsberg
 The Lion for Real (Great Jones, 1989)
 The Ballad of the Skeletons (Mercury, 1996)
 Wichita Vortex Sutra (Artemis, 2004)

With Ely Guerra
 Lotofire (Higher Octave, 2002)

With Joe Henry
 Scar (Mammoth, 2001)
 Blood from Stars (Anti, 2009)
 Reverie (Anti, 2011)

With Naif Herin
 Faites du bruit (2010)

With Yuka Honda
 Eucademix (Tzadik, 2004)

With The Jazz Passengers
 Broken Night, Red Light (Crepuscule, 1987)
 Deranged and Decomposed (Crepuscule, 1988)
 Live at the Knitting Factory Vol. 1 (A&M, 1989) - 2 tracks
 Implement Yourself (New World/CounterCurrents, 1990)
 In Love (High Street, 1994)
 Cross the Street (Les Disques du Crepuscule (Belgium), 1995)
 Individually Twisted (32 Records, 1996)

With Freedy Johnston
 This Perfect World (Elektra, 1994)

With Norah Jones
 The Fall (Blue Note, 2009)

With Hoppy Kamiyama
 King of Music (Toshiba-EMI (Japan), 1991)
 Welcome to Forbidden Paridise (Toshiba-EMI (Japan), 1992)
 Optical*8 (God Mountain (Japan), 1992)
 Groovallegience (Toshiba-EMI (Japan), 1996)

With Mory Kanté
 Nongo Village (Barclay (France), 1993)

With The Klezmatics
 Jews with Horns (Xenophile, 1995) 

With Makigami Koichi
 Koroshi No Blues (Toshiba-EMI Japan, 1993)

With Mary La Rose
 The Blue Guitar (Little Music, 2006)

With The Latebirds
 Fortune Cookies (Grandpop, 2003)

With Gina Leishman
 Bed Time (GCQ, 2004)
 In My Skin (GCQ, 2007)

With Arto Lindsay
 O Corpo Sutil (The Subtle Body) (Rykodisc, 1996)
 Mundo Civilizado (Rykodisc, 1996)

With David Linx
 L'Instant D'Apres (Polygram International, 2001)

With Frank London
 The Shvitz (Knitting Factory Works, 1993)

With the Lounge Lizards
 Big Heart: Live in Tokyo (Antilles, 1986)
 No Pain For Cakes (Antilles, 1987)
 Voice of Chunk (Lagarto Productions, 1989)

With Allen Lowe
 Jews in Hell (Spaceout, 2007)

With Evan Lurie
 Kizu (CBS/Sony, 1988) with Yoshitada Minami
 Pieces for Bandoneon (Les Disques du Crepuscule (Belgium), 1989)
 Selling Water by the Side of the River (Antilles, 1990)
 Il Piccolo Diavolo (Ciak (Italy), 1991) 
 How I Spent My Vacation (Tzadik, 1998)

With John Lurie
 Down by Law Soundtrack (Crammed Discs, 1987)
 Mystery Train - (RCA/Victor, 1989)
 African Swim and Mannie & Lo (Strange & Beautiful Music, 1998)

With Giovanni Maier
 Giovanni Maier Technicolor/A Turtle Soup (Long Song, 2008)

With Maria McKee
 Maria McKee (Geffen Goldline, 1989)

With Kirsty McGee
Those Old Demons (Hobopop, 2014)

With Medeski Martin & Wood
 It's a Jungle in Here (Gramavision, 1993)
 The Dropper (Blue Note, 2000)
 End of the World Party (Just in Case) (Blue Note, 2004)

With Jun Miyake
 Hoshi No Tama No O (Entropathy) (Sony (Japan), 1993)

With Marisa Monte
 Mais (World Pacific, 1991)
 Memórias, Crônicas, e Declaracões de Amor (EMI, 2000)

With Ikue Mori
 Painted Desert (Avant, 1995)

With Sarah Jane Morris
 Fallen Angel (Irma, 1998)
 August (Fallen Angel/Indigo, 2002)

With Jean-Louis Murat
 Mustango (Labels/Virgin, 1999)

With Roy Nathanson
 Lobster & Friend (Knitting Factory Works, 1993) with Anthony Coleman
 I Could've Been a Drum (Tzadik, 1997) with Anthony Coleman
 Fire at Keaton's Bar & Grill (Six Degrees, 2000)

With Steve Nieve
 Welcome to the Voice (Deutsche Grammophon, 2007)

With Sean Noonan Brewed by Noon
 Stoies to Tell (Songlines, 2007)
 Live from New York and Beyond... (Innova, 2008)
 Boxing Dreams (Songlines, 2008)

With Seigen Ono
 Comme Des Garcons, Vol. 2 (Venture/Virgin, 1989)
 Forty Days and Forty Nights (Kitty/Saidera, 1991) 
 Maria & Maria (Saidera, 2001)

With Mike Patton
 Pranzo Oltranzista (Tzadik, 1997)

With Madeleine Peyroux
 Dreamland (Atlantic, 1996)

With Philadelphy's Paint
 Paint: Tap the Ethereal (Extraplatte, 2005)

With Sam Phillips
 Cruel Inventions (Virgin, 1991)
 Martinis and Bikinis (Virgin, 1994)
 Omnipop (It's Only a Flesh Wound Lambchop) (Virgin, 1996)
 Fan Dance (Nonesuch, 2001)
 A Boot and a Shoe (Nonesuch, 2004)

With Pissuk Rachav
 Eretz Hakodesh (Tzadik, 2009)

With Robert Plant & Alison Krauss
 Raising Sand (Rounder, 2007)

With David Poe
 David Poe (ulfTone Music, 2001)

With Jim Pugliese
 Jim Pugliese's Save III: Live @ Issue Project Room NYC (Improvvisatore Involontario, 2008)

With Greg Ribot and The International Conspiracy
 Cumbia del Norte (Cathexis, 1999)

With Stan Ridgway
 Mosquitos (Geffen, 1989)

With Jon Rose
 Techno Mit Störungen (Plag Dich Nicht, 1998)

With Rough Assemblage
 Construction & Demolition (Avant (Japan), 1995)

With David Sanborn
 Another Hand (Elektra, 1991)

With Boris Savoldelli
 Insanology (BTF, 2008)

With 17 Hippies
 17 Hippies Play Guitar (Hipster, 2006)

With David Shea
 Prisoner (Sub Rosa, 1994)
 Hsi-Yu Chi (Tzadik, 1995)

With Harry Shearer
 It Must Have Been Something I Said (Rhino, 1994)

With Howard Shore
 The Departed (Original Score) (Watertower, 2006)

With Sion
 Spring, Summer, Fall and Winter (1987)
 I Don't Like Myself (Baidis Records (Japan), 1993)

With Slut
 Slut (God Mountain (Japan), 1993)

With Wadada Leo Smith
 Lake Biwa (Tzadik, 2004)

With Tim Sparks
 At the Rebbe's Table (Tzadik, 2002)

With Shelby Starner
 From in the Shadows (Warner Bros., 1999)

With Syd Straw
 Surprise (Virgin, 1989)

With The Surfers
 Songs from the Pipe (Epic, 1998)

With David Sylvian
 Dead Bees on a Cake (Virgin, 1999)

With Third Person
 The Bends (Knitting Factory, 1991)

With Yoko Ono
 Warzone (Sony, 2018)

With Tanita Tikaram
 Ancient Heart (Warner Bros., 1988)

With Allen Toussaint
 The Bright Mississippi (Nonesuch, 2009)

With Tricky
 Angels with Dirty Faces (Island, 1998)

With Tift Merritt
 Traveling Alone (Yep, 2012)
 Stitch of the World (Yep, 2017)

With Paula Cole
 Ithaca (Decca, 2010)

With McCoy Tyner
 Guitars (McCoy Tyner/Half Note, 2008)

With Kazutoki Umezu
 Eclecticism (Knitting Factory, 1994)
 First Deserter (Knitting Factory, 1997)

With Sara Bareilles
 Amidst the Chaos (Epic, 2019)

With Silvain Vanot
 Sur des Arbres (Virgin (France), 1995)

With Caetano Veloso
 Estrangeiro (Elektra/Musician, 1989)

With Tom Waits
 Rain Dogs (Island, 1985)
 Franks Wild Years (Island, 1987)
 Mule Variations (Anti/Epitaph, 1999)
 Real Gone (Anti/Epitaph, 2004)
 Bad as Me (Anti, 2011)

With Bill Ware
 This Is No Time (Eight Ball, 1997) with Groove Thing
 Sir Duke (Knitting Factory, 2001)

With Rob Wasserman
 Trios (MCA/GRP, 1994)

With Sanda Weigl
 Gypsy Killer (Knitting Factory, 2002)

With John Mellencamp
 No Better Than This (Rounder Records, 2010)

With Cassandra Wilson
 Thunderbird (Blue Note, 2006)

With Norman Yamada
 Being and Time (Tzadik, 1998)

With Akiko Yano
 Akiko (Tabi, 2009)

With Zakarya
 413 A (Tzadik, 2006)

With Hector Zazou
 Chansons des mers froides (Columbia, 1994)
 Made on Earth (Crammed Disc, 1997) with Barbara Gogan
 Las Vegas is Curved (First World, 2001) with Sandy Dillon 

With Amir Ziv's Kotkot
 Alive at Tonic (Mai Nya Neem, 2008)

With John Zorn
 Filmworks VII: Cynical Hysterie Hour (CBS/Sony (Japan), 1989)
 Kristallnacht (Eva, 1993)
 John Zorn's Cobra: Live at the Knitting Factory (Knitting Factory, 1995)
 Filmworks II: Music for an Untitled Film by Walter Hill (Toy's Factory, 1995)
 Filmworks III: 1990-1995 (Toy's Factory, 1996)
 Bar Kokhba (Tzadik, 1996)
 Filmworks V: Tears of Ecstasy (Tzadik, 1996)
 Filmworks VI: 1996 (Tzadik, 1996)
 Filmworks IV: S&M + More (Tzadik, 1997)
 Filmworks VIII: 1997 (Tzadik, 1998)
 The Circle Maker (Tzadik, 1997) with Bar Kokhba
 Music for Children (Tzadik, 1998)
 Taboo & Exile (Tzadik, 1999)
 The Big Gundown 15th Anniversary Edition (Tzadik, 2000)
 The Gift (Tzadik, 2000)
 Filmworks XII: Three Documentaries (Tzadik, 2002)
 Filmworks XIII: Invitation to a Suicide (Tzadik, 2002)
 Filmworks XIV: Hiding and Seeking (2003)
 Masada Guitars (Tzadik, 2003) solo performances by Marc Ribot, Tim Sparks and Bill Frisell
 50th Birthday Celebration Volume 4 (Tzadik, 2004) with Electric Masada
 50th Birthday Celebration Volume 11 (Tzadik, 2005) with Bar Kokhba Sextet
 Masada Rock (Tzadik, 2005) with Rashanim
 Electric Masada: At the Mountains of Madness (Tzadik, 2005) with Electric Masada
 Filmworks XVIII: The Treatment (Tzadik, 2006)
 The Dreamers (Tzadik, 2008) with The Dreamers
 The Crucible (Tzadik, 2008) with Moonchild
 O'o (Tzadik, 2009) with The Dreamers 
 Ipos: Book of Angels Volume 14 (Tzadik, 2010) with The Dreamers 
 Enigmata (2011) with Trevor Dunn
 A Dreamers Christmas (Tzadik, 2011) with The Dreamers
 Valentine’s Day (Tzadik, 2014) with Trevor Dunn and Tyshawn Sorey
 Pellucidar: A Dreamers Fantabula (Tzadik, 2015) with The Dreamers
 The True Discoveries Of Witches And Demons (Tzadik, 2015) with Simulacrum and Trevor Dunn

With Diana Krall
 Glad Rag Doll (Verve, 2012)
 Turn Up the Quiet (Verve, 2017)
 This Dream of You (Verve, 2020)

With Youn Sun Nah
 She Moves On (ACT, 2017)

References

External links
Marc Ribot official website
The Discography of Marc Ribot by Patrice Roussel

Jazz discographies
 

Discographies of American artists